Racquet is a 1979 American comedy film starring Bert Convy as a tennis player. The picture is notable for featuring real-life tennis champions Bobby Riggs and Björn Borg in acting roles.

It was described as "Shampoo for the tennis set."

It was originally known as Raquets.

Cast
Bert Convy as Tommy Everett
Lynda Day George as Monica Gordon
Edie Adams as Leslie Sargent
Phil Silvers as Arthur Sargent
Bobby Riggs as Charlie
Tanya Roberts as Bambi
Bruce Kimmel as Arnold
Dorothy Konrad as Mrs. Kaufman
Björn Borg as himself
Susan Tyrell as Miss Baxter
Judd Hamilton as performer

References

External links

1979 films
American sports comedy films
Tennis films
Cultural depictions of Björn Borg
1970s sports comedy films
1979 comedy films
1970s English-language films
Films directed by David Winters
1970s American films